Artitropa boseae is a species of butterfly in the family Hesperiidae. It is found in northern and eastern Madagascar. The habitat consists of forest margins and anthropogenic environments.

References

Butterflies described in 1880
Hesperiinae
Butterflies of Africa
Taxa named by Max Saalmüller